Edward David Phillips (February 17, 1901 – January 26, 1968) was an American professional baseball catcher. He played in Major League Baseball (MLB) from 1924 through 1935 for the Boston Braves, Detroit Tigers, Pittsburgh Pirates, New York Yankees, Washington Senators, and Cleveland Indians. Phillips was born in Worcester, Massachusetts. He batted and threw right-handed.

He helped the Yankees win the 1932 World Series.

In 6 seasons he played in 312 games and had 997 at bats, 82 runs, 236 hits, 54 doubles, 6 triples, 14 home runs, 126 RBI, 3 stolen bases, 104 walks, .237 batting average, .312 on-base percentage, .345 slugging percentage, 344 total bases and 15 sacrifice hits.

He died in Buffalo, New York at the age of 66.

Sources

1901 births
1968 deaths
Major League Baseball catchers
Baseball players from Worcester, Massachusetts
Boston Braves players
Detroit Tigers players
Pittsburgh Pirates players
New York Yankees players
Washington Senators (1901–1960) players
Cleveland Indians players
Hagerstown Owls players
Minor league baseball managers
Boston College Eagles baseball players
Nashville Vols players